The 2004 Russian Super Cup was the 2nd Russian Super Cup match, a football match which was contested between the 2003 Russian Premier League champion, CSKA Moscow and the winner of 2002–03 Russian Cup, Spartak Moscow. The match was held on 7 March 2004 at the Lokomotiv Stadium in Moscow, Russia. CSKA Moscow beat Spartak Moscow 3–1 in extra time, after the normal time had finished in a 1–1 draw, to win their first Russian Super Cup.

Match details

See also
2004 in Russian football
2003 Russian Premier League
2002–03 Russian Cup

External links
 Official stats

Super Cup
Russian Super Cup
Russian Super Cup 2004
Russian Super Cup 2004
March 2004 sports events in Europe
2004 in Moscow
Sports competitions in Moscow